Cailler may refer to :
 François-Louis Cailler (1796-1852), Swiss chocolatier and industrialist
 Cailler, Swiss chocolate brand founded by him
 Alexandre François Louis Cailler (1866-1936), Swiss industrialist, grandson of François-Louis Cailler